The French League (: "French League for purging, mutual aid and European collaboration") was a collaborationist French movement founded by Pierre Costantini in September 1940.  Its journal was entitled L'Appel.

Bibliography 
 Pierre Philippe Lambert, Gérard Le Marec, Partis et mouvements de la collaboration, éditions Jacques Grancher, 1993.
 Pascal Ory, Les Collaborateurs, éditions du seuil, Paris, 1976,

French collaboration during World War II
French far right leagues